Liparis bracteata, commonly known as the yellow sphinx orchid, is a plant in the orchid family. It is an epiphytic or lithophytic orchid with cone-shaped pseudobulbs, each with two linear to lance-shaped leaves and between seven and twelve star-shaped pale green flowers that turn yellow as they age. This orchid grows on trees and rocks in rainforest in tropical North Queensland.

Description
The flowering stem has up to fifteen bracts and the flowers turn yellow as they age. Flowering occurs between July and September.

Taxonomy and naming
Liparis bracteata was first formally described in 1946 by Trevor Edgar Hunt who published the description in the North Queensland Naturalist. The type specimen was collected by John Henry Wilkie on Mount Bartle Frere. The specific epithet (bracteata) is derived from the Latin word bractea, meaning "small leaf".

Distribution and habitat
The yellow sphinx orchid grows on trees and rocks in rainforest between the Cedar Bay and the Tully River in Queensland.

References 

bracteata
Orchids of Queensland
Plants described in 1946